The 14603 / 14604 Saharsa–Amritsar Jan Sadharan Express is an Express train belonging to Northern Railway zone that runs between  and  in India. It is currently being operated with 14603/14604 train numbers on a weekly basis.

Service

The 14603/Saharsa–Amritsar Jan Sadharan Express has an average speed of 45 km/hr and covers 1568 km in 34h 30m. The 14604/Amritsar–Saharsa Weekly Jan Sadharan Express has an average speed of 51 km/hr and covers 1568 km in 30h 50m.

Route & halts

The important halts of the train are:

Coach composition

The train has standard Hybrid-LHB rakes with max speed of 130 kmph. The train consists of 18 coaches:

 16 General Unreserved
 2 Seating cum Luggage Rake

Traction

Both trains are hauled by a Ghaziabad / Tughlakabad-based WAP-7 locomotive from Saharsa Junction to Amritsar Junction and vice versa.

Rake sharing

The train shares its rake with 22423/22424  Gorakhpur–Amritsar Jan Sadharan Express.

See also 

 Saharsa Junction railway station
 Amritsar Junction railway station
 Danapur–Anand Vihar Jan Sadharan Express
 Gorakhpur–Amritsar Jan Sadharan Express

Notes

References

External links 

 14603/Saharsa - Amritsar Jan Sadharan Express India Rail Info
 14604/Amritsar - Saharsa Jan Sadharan Express India Rail Info

Transport in Saharsa
Transport in Amritsar
Jan Sadharan Express trains
Rail transport in Bihar
Rail transport in Uttar Pradesh
Rail transport in Haryana
Rail transport in Punjab, India